Phophi Constance Ramathuba (born 15 August 1973) is a South African politician and medical doctor. She has been the Limpopo MEC (Member of the Executive Council) for Health and a Member of the Limpopo Provincial Legislature since May 2015. Ramathuba is a member of the African National Congress.

Early life and career
Ramathuba was born on 15 August 1973 at Elim Hospital, Waterval and grew up in Mashamba, then part of South Africa's Transvaal Province. She is one of five children. She matriculated at Mbilwi Secondary School and studied at the Sefako Makgatho Health Sciences University (formerly known as MEDUNSA), where she obtained a bachelor of medicine and a bachelor of surgery degree. From the University of Pretoria, she received a master's degree in medical pharmacology. Ramathuba had also fulfilled courses in health and business leadership.

Ramathuba started her career as an intern at the Mokopane Hospital. Prior to being appointed to the Limpopo provincial government, she was the chief executive of the Voortrekker Hospital and the chairperson of the SA Medical Association.

Political career
Ramathuba is a long-standing member of the African National Congress. She serves as a member of the party's provincial executive committee. On 27 May 2015, Ramathuba was sworn in as a member of the Limpopo Provincial Legislature, representing the ANC. On the same day, premier Stanley Mathabatha appointed her Member of the Executive Council for Health, succeeding Maaria Ishmael Kgetjepe. The changes came into effect immediately.

Ramathuba was re-elected to the provincial legislature in the 2019 Limpopo provincial election held on 8 May. On 22 May 2019, Mathabatha announced that she would remain as Health MEC.

In January 2022, Ramathuba came under criticism for telling schoolgirls at the Gwenane Secondary School in Sekgakgapeng to "open your books and close your legs". 

In August 2022 Ramathuba's remarks to a bed-ridden Zimbabwean patient in Bela-Bela, went viral. On the video she accused foreigners of abusing state resources allocated to South African Nationals stating: “you are killing my health system. When you guys are sick you just cross the Limpopo River, there’s an MEC there who is running a charity department.” Politicians such as EFF MP Mbuyiseni Ndlozi  and Mmusi Maimane criticized Ramathuba for humiliating the patient and called for the revocation of her medical licence.

Personal life
Ramathuba has two daughters. On 1 July 2020, Mathabatha announced that Ramathuba had tested positive for COVID-19.

References

External links

Phophi Ramathuba, Dr
Profile for Dr. Phophi Ramathuba, Member of the Executive Council (MEC)

Living people
1973 births
People from Limpopo
21st-century South African politicians
21st-century South African women politicians
African National Congress politicians
Members of the Limpopo Provincial Legislature
University of Pretoria alumni
Women members of provincial legislatures of South Africa